PPN may refer to:
Guillermo León Valencia Airport
Pre-Pottery Neolithic
Pinoleville Pomo Nation
Nigerien Progressive Party-African Democratic Rally, from the French acronym, Parti Progressiste Nigérien
Pandit Pran Nath
Pingat Pangkuan Negara, a Malaysian honour
Pedunculopontine nucleus
Principal protected note, an investment product
Protoplanetary nebula
Parameterized post-Newtonian formalism, a classification system for different theories of gravity
Pure proportional navigation, a variant of proportional navigation in which acceleration commands are perpendicular to the velocity vector of the missile
 Pharmacy Product Number
 Pacific Patriot Network
Procurement Policy Notes issued by the United Kingdom's Cabinet Office

See also
Bis(triphenylphosphine)iminium chloride (PPNCl), a source of PPN+ cation